Przemysław Domański (born 27 June 1986, in Warsaw) is a Polish former competitive figure skater. He is a four-time Polish national champion and competed at the 2010 Winter Olympics.

He began skating at the age of five; the bones in his feet were growing in the wrong direction and his doctor advised he should do a sport using inflexible boots or wear orthopedic boots until he was 18.

Programs

Competitive highlights
JGP: Junior Grand Prix

References

External links 

 

Polish male single skaters
1986 births
Figure skaters from Warsaw
Living people
Figure skaters at the 2010 Winter Olympics
Olympic figure skaters of Poland
Competitors at the 2009 Winter Universiade